The 2007 Bitburger Open Grand Prix was a badminton tournament which took place in Saarbrücken, Germany from 2 to 7 October 2007. It had a total purse of $70,000.

Tournament 
The 2007 Bitburger Open Grand Prix was the eighth tournament of the 2007 BWF Grand Prix Gold and Grand Prix and also part of the Bitburger Open championships which has been held since 1988. This tournament was organized by the German Badminton Association and sanctioned by the BWF.

Venue 
This international tournament was held at Saarlandhalle in Saarbrücken, Germany.

Point distribution 
Below is the point distribution for each phase of the tournament based on the BWF points system for the BWF Grand Prix event.

Prize money 
The total prize money for this tournament was US$70,000. Distribution of prize money was in accordance with BWF regulations.

Men's singles

Seeds 

 Przemysław Wacha (second round)
 Lee Tsuen Seng (final)
 Anup Sridhar (third round)
 Joachim Persson (semi-finals)
 Andrew Dabeka (second round)
 Kasper Ødum (second round)
 Björn Joppien (quarter-finals)
 Chetan Anand (third round)

Finals

Top half

Section 1

Section 2

Bottom half

Section 3

Section 4

Women's singles

Seeds 

 Huaiwen Xu (quarter-finals)
 Jiang Yanjiao (semi-finals)
 Juliane Schenk (final)
 Ella Diehl (quarter-finals)
 Judith Meulendijks (second round)
 Sara Persson (withdrew)
 Larisa Griga (second round)
 Ragna Ingólfsdóttir (first round)

Finals

Top half

Section 1

Section 2

Bottom half

Section 3

Section 4

Men's doubles

Seeds 

 Michael Fuchs / Roman Spitko (second round)
 Kristof Hopp / Ingo Kindervater (quarter-finals)
 Rasmus Andersen / Peter Steffensen (quarter-finals)
 Robert Adcock / Robin Middleton (second round)
 Robert Blair / David Lindley (final)
 Tim Dettmann / Johannes Schöttler (second round)
 Sun Junjie / Xu Chen (semi-finals)
 He Hanbin / Shen Ye (semi-finals)

Finals

Top half

Section 1

Section 2

Bottom half

Section 3

Section 4

Women's doubles

Seeds 

 Yang Wei / Zhang Jiewen (champions)
 Nicole Grether / Juliane Schenk (quarter-finals)
 Elin Bergblom / Johanna Persson (second round)
 Jwala Gutta / Shruti Kurien (semi-finals)
 Imogen Bankier / Emma Mason (second round)
 Michaela Peiffer / Kathrin Piotrowski (quarter-finals)
 Natalie Munt / Joanne Nicholas (final)
 Carina Mette / Birgit Overzier (second round)

Finals

Top half

Section 1

Section 2

Bottom half

Section 3

Section 4

Mixed doubles

Seeds 

 Ingo Kindervater / Kathrin Piotrowski (semi-finals)
 Kristof Hopp / Birgit Overzier (champions)
 David Lindley / Suzanne Rayappan (second round)
 Tim Dettmann / Annekatrin Lillie (quarter-finals)
 Joachim Fischer Nielsen / Britta Andersen (quarter-finals)
 Robin Middleton / Liza Parker (quarter-finals)
 Xu Chen / Tian Qing (semi-finals)
 He Hanbin / Pan Pan (quarter-finals)

Finals

Top half

Section 1

Section 2

Bottom half

Section 3

Section 4

References

External links 
Tournament Link

SaarLorLux Open
Bitburger Open
Bitburger Open Grand Prix
Bitburger Open Grand Prix